The government and people of Niger observe twelve official public holidays.  These include international commemorations, the commemoration of important dates in the history of Niger, and religious holidays.  Both Christian and Muslim holidays are observed as official public holidays.  While the former colonial power, France, instituted Christian observances, the vast majority of Nigeriens are Muslim.

Muslim holidays are dependent on the Islamic calendar, and—like Christian Easter—move from year to year.  Some Muslim holidays are also dependent upon astronomical sightings (e.g.: the observance of moonrise for Ramadan).  National commemorations and secular international holidays are fixed on the Gregorian calendar, the standard civil calendar used in Niger as most of the world.

Nigeriens celebrate a number of other holidays, festivals, and commemorations which are not public holidays. Some are yearly civic commemorations, some religious, ethnic, or regional festivals which may be widely celebrated only by specific groups or in specific areas.  Other yearly events, such as cultural festivals, markets, or sporting events may be much anticipated events without being legal holidays.

Official holidays
Below are the twelve official public holidays recognized by the Government of Niger.  Businesses, schools, and public services are closed on these days.  They are often dates of public festivals, political speeches, and large gatherings.

Fixed holidays

The following are official public holidays whose date may vary, according to their corresponding calendar.  Some Muslim holiday observance is also dependent upon local astronomical observance.  For the period 2008–2013, the order they occur:

Other festivals
Nigeriens celebrate a number of holidays and festivals.  Many are regional, recognized partially or only locally by government, or are traditions of specific ethnic groups.  They include:

 The Cure salée : annual gathering of Tuareg and Fulani nomadic clans at Ingall (August or September);
 Guérewol : The "Bororo" Fulani matchmaking festival at the end of the rainy season (August or September).  Famous for the traditional makeup and dancing of young Fulani men eager to woo a spouse, Guérewol take place both in conjunction with the Cure salée, as well as at other traditional gather spots of nomadic people in northern Niger;
 "National Day of Nigerien Women" -- "Journée nationale de la femme nigérienne" (13 May).  Commemorates a 1992 march by women in Niamey during the National Conference period, demanding greater involvement of women in national institutions.  Made a "National Commemoration" 25 November 1992.
 "Festival national de la jeunesse, des sports et de la culture": Government sponsored national youth sport and cultural competition (annual);
 National championship of Lutte Traditionnelle (traditional wrestling).  Contestants progress from Regional championships to team completion which awards a prestigious trophy—a ceremonial sabre—to one region;
 "Foires agro-sylvo pastorales":  annual Agropastoral governance and cultural forum, Niamey;
 "Prix Dan Gourmou" : Annual music competition and festival, Niamey;
 "FIMA", "Festival International de la Mode Africaine" (International Festival of African Fashion) every two years in Niamey;
 "Rencontres Théâtrales du Niger": National theater festival ;
 "Festival international de conte"/ " Gatan - Gatan ": Festival of traditional story telling;
 "Salon international de l'artisanat pour la femme" (SAFEM): Women Artisans festival, Niamey;
 "Festival de l'Aïr" (27–29 December): Music and arts festival at Iférouane;
 " Hotoungo " at Gangui, a local traditional farmers gathering and festival;
 " Bianou " festival at Agadez;
 " Wassan Kara "  festival at Zinder;
 The " Guetna " at Tassara, Annual festival among the nomadic Diffa Arabs.;
 Annual Anza animist religious festival at Massalata - Konni, near Dogondutchi;
 Traditional fishermen's festival at Karay-Kopto on the River Niger;
 " Gossi ", a Soninké animist festival at Karma-Songhaï on the River Niger;
 "Fête de la girafe" (15 September), Kouré, near Niamey, celebrating the West African Giraffe native to the area;
 le " Sharow " Puel festival;
 Traditional boxing tournaments ("Faka") each year after harvest in December or January, Zinder Region;
 " Mani Hori ": festival of traditional Songhai women's crafts, each year after harvest in December or January.

References

 
Nigerien culture
Niger